Charles Marriott was a rugby union international who represented England from 1884 to 1887. He also captained his country.

Charles Marriott was born on 15 July 1861 in Rendham, Suffolk.

Rugby union and later career
Marriott made his international debut on 5 January 1884 at Cardigan Fields, Leeds in the England vs Wales match.
Of the 7 matches he played for his national side he was on the winning side on 5 occasions, but he didn't score any points in any of these matches.
He played his final match for England on 5 February 1887 at Lansdowne Road in the Ireland vs England match.

Marriott taught at Highgate School from 1892 until 1903. He was Secretary of the Rugby Football Union from 1907 to 1924.

References

External links
 

1861 births
1936 deaths
English rugby union players
England international rugby union players
Rugby union forwards
Rugby union players from Suffolk